The following lists events that happened during 2017 in the State of Palestine.

Incumbents
State of Palestine (UN observer non-member State)
Mahmoud Abbas (PLO), President, 8 May 2005-current
Rami Hamdallah, Prime Minister, 6 June 2013-current
Gaza Strip (Hamas administration unrecognized by the United Nations)
Ismail Haniyeh (Hamas), Prime Minister, 29 March 2006-current

Events

November

November 1 
Israeli forces arrest journalist and prisoners' rights activist Bushra al-Tawil and sentences her to six months in administrative detention.

See also
 2017 in Israel
 List of violent incidents in the Israeli–Palestinian conflict, 2017

References

 
State of Palestine
Years of the 21st century in the State of Palestine
2010s in the State of Palestine
State of Palestine